Rouvroy (Gaumais : Rouvrou) is a municipality of Wallonia located in the province of Luxembourg, Belgium. 

On 1 January 2007 the municipality, which covers 27.68 km2, had 2,007 inhabitants, giving a population density of 72.5 inhabitants per km2. Wallonia and Belgium's southernmost point is situated in the municipality, at Torgny.

Formed in 1976, the municipality consists of the following district: Dampicourt, Harnoncourt, Lamorteau, Rouvroy, and Torgny. Other population centers include: Couvreux and Montquintin.

See also
 List of protected heritage sites in Rouvroy, Belgium

References

External links
 

 
Municipalities of Luxembourg (Belgium)